Francis Henry Williams (24 May 1888 – 8 September 1959) was an Australian rules footballer who played with Carlton in the Victorian Football League (VFL).

Notes

External links 

Frank Williams's profile at Blueseum

1888 births
1959 deaths
Australian rules footballers from Melbourne
Carlton Football Club players
People from Carlton North, Victoria